Pleasant Valley Creek is a stream in the U.S. state of South Dakota.

Pleasant Valley Creek has the commendatory name of the valley which contains its watercourse.

See also
List of rivers of South Dakota

References

Rivers of Custer County, South Dakota
Rivers of South Dakota